Dlouhá Lhota is a municipality and village in Příbram District in the Central Bohemian Region of the Czech Republic. It has about 400 inhabitants.

Geography
It lies in the Brdy Highlands. The Lhotecký Brook flows through the municipality and supplies a system of several small ponds.

History
The first written mention of Dlouhá Lhota is from 1336. From 1364 to 1654, the village was called Bavorova Lhota after Bavors of Strakonice, who had built here the church.

Transport
The D4 motorway passes through the municipality.

Sights
The landmarks of Dlouhá Lhota are the castle and the church. The Church of Saint John the Evangelist was originally a Gothic building, first documented in 1359. At the end of the 16th century, it was modified in Renaissance style. Baroque reconstruction took place in the second half of the 18th century. The church is considered a historically very valuable rural building. Valuable is also the statue of Saint John of Nepomuk from the second half of the 18th century.

The Dlouhá Lhota Castle was built in the early Baroque style in the late 17th century. It was built on the site of a Renaissance fortress, destroyed during the Thirty Years' War. Around 1800, it was completely rebuilt, and further Neoclassical modification were made during the 19th century. The castle is surrounded by a park. The castle building has no use and is inaccessible.

Notable people
Lukáš Černohorský (born 1984), politician

References

External links

Villages in Příbram District